S. nana may refer to:

 Scoliacma nana, a moth species found in Australia
 Scutellaria nana, the dwarf skullcap, a plant species
 Siebera nana, a plant species in the genus Siebera found in Palestine
 Sphingonaepiopsis nana, the savanna hawkmoth, a moth species found from Iran to Natal
 Stelis nana, Lindl., 1858, an orchid species in the genus Stelis found in Ecuador and Peru
 Stiobia nana, the sculpin snail, a gastropod species endemic to the United States
 Sturnira nana, the lesser yellow-shouldered bat, a bat species endemic to Peru
 Sylvia nana, the Asian desert warbler, a bird species found in south central temperate Asia
 Synanceia nana, the Red Sea stonefish or dwarf scorpionfish, a venomous fish species

See also 
 Nana (disambiguation)